Philip Stevenson was an American novelist and screenwriter. He married Janet Stevenson.

Career 
Stevenson was "a socially conscious novelist and playwright who was an active participant in Santa Fe, New Mexico's art colony. His Sure Fire: Episodes in the Life of Billy the Kid, written for the 1931 Fiesta, was long remembered. Like many others in the 1930s, Stevenson was attracted to Communism as a solution to the devastating economic problems of that era. After leaving Santa Fe about 1939, he wrote screenplays in Hollywood and continued to write plays and novels, including a trilogy of novels published under the pseudonym, Lars Lawrence. He died in 1965 while touring the Soviet Union."

He purchased a home in Santa Fe in 1930.

His home in Santa Fe, at 408 Delgado Street, is listed on the National Register of Historic Places as a contributing building in the Camino del Monte Sol Historic District.

References

1965 deaths
20th-century American novelists
Year of birth missing
American male novelists
Place of birth missing
American male screenwriters
Writers from Santa Fe, New Mexico
20th-century American male writers
20th-century American screenwriters